Princess Birgitta of Sweden  (Birgitta Ingeborg Alice; born 19 January 1937) is an elder sister of King Carl XVI Gustaf.

Family
Born at Haga Palace in Stockholm, she is the second child of Prince Gustaf Adolf, Duke of Västerbotten, and Princess Sibylla of Saxe-Coburg and Gotha, and a granddaughter of King Gustaf VI Adolf. Her sisters are Princess Margaretha, Mrs. Ambler, Princess Désirée, Baroness Silfverschiöld, and Princess Christina, Mrs. Magnuson. She is a first cousin of Queen Margrethe II of Denmark and Queen Anne-Marie of Greece. 

Among her sisters she alone married a man of princely status, and, in keeping with the tradition that princesses who marry princes retain their royal status, Princess Birgitta retained her Swedish style of Royal Highness, a higher treatment than that of Serene Highness, to which the Princes of Hohenzollern and their wives were historically entitled.

Marriage

In 1959, Birgitta met Prince Johann Georg of Hohenzollern at a cocktail party in Germany. On  15 December 1960, their engagement was announced.

The couple were married in a civil ceremony in the Hall of State of the Royal Palace of Stockholm on  25 May 1961. The bride's grandfather, King Gustaf VI Adolf, hoped for a Lutheran ceremony, but Pope John XXIII forbade this. The bridesmaids were the bride’s sister Princess Christina and cousin Princess Benedikte of Denmark; the groomsmen were the bride's brother Crown Prince Carl Gustaf and her cousin Count Michael Bernadotte of Wisborg (son of Sigvard Bernadotte). That evening, the King held a ball at the Royal Palace. A Roman Catholic ceremony was held at Sankt Johann Church at the groom's family seat of Sigmaringen, Germany, on 30 May 1961. Birgitta applied to convert to Roman Catholicism when she married the Hohenzollern prince, but her application was rejected in wording which questioned her spiritual commitment to the change.

Of her marriage, she had three children: Carl (b. 1962), Désirée (b. 1963), and Hubertus (b. 1966). She and her children were passed over for succession to the Swedish throne when subsequent absolute primogeniture was established in Sweden in 1979 and 1980, and then only included her brother's descendants and her uncle Prince Bertil.

Prince Johann Georg and Princess Birgitta separated in 1990, although they remained legally married. She lived on the island of Majorca in Spain, while her husband lived in Munich. He died in 2016.

Public life
In November 1960, Birgitta visited the United States accompanied by her younger sister Princess Désirée on behalf of their grandfather King Gustaf VI Adolf for the 50th anniversary of The American-Scandinavian Foundation. In their honour a ball was organised for the two princesses at the Renaissance Blackstone Hotel in Chicago by Mayor Richard Daley.

Princess Birgitta was involved with golf and charities outside of Sweden and was an honorary board member of the (British) Royal Swedish Golfing Society, a position she took over when her uncle Prince Bertil died. She had her own golf competition in Majorca, the Princess Birgitta Trophy, at her home golf course.

On Christmas Day 2022 Sweden's national public service Sveriges Television broadcast a recent hour-long  documentary and interview with the princess where she detailed her often troubling life as a Swedish royal.

Titles, styles, honours and arms

Titles and styles
 19 January 1937 – 25 May 1961: Her Royal Highness Princess Birgitta of Sweden 
 25 May 1961 – Present: Her Royal Highness Princess Birgitta of Sweden, Princess of Hohenzollern

Honours
 : Member of the Royal Order of the Seraphim (LoK av KMO)

Arms

Ancestry

See also
 Swedish Royal Family

References

External links

1937 births
Living people
People from Solna Municipality
Swedish princesses
House of Bernadotte
Swedish Lutherans
Swedish people of German descent
Grand Crosses 1st class of the Order of Merit of the Federal Republic of Germany
Exercise instructors